Island House was a locally listed building in Birmingham's Eastside area, with a roughly triangular footprint, and was built in 1912  by the architect G. E. Pepper. It was built in the Edwardian Mannerist style, ornately decorated with both Ionic and Doric decorations. Originally it was designed to be used as office building and warehouse for the prominent “Messrs Churchill & Co” machine tool company. The opening ceremony of Island House was held in 1913.

Located next to the Masshouse developments, Island House was occupied by teams from Birmingham City Council's arts team, including Film Birmingham, Urban Fusion and ArtsFest. The building was used in conjunction with other establishments in the city, including the Ikon Gallery.

Although Island House's future was jeopardised by the City Park Gate development, the building (along with a local public house, the Fox and Grapes) was included in these plans; with a refurbishment and an upwards extension designed by Make Architects for Quintain.

In early 2012 there was a campaign to save Island House, which Quintain had successfully applied for permission to demolish. Permission, in principle, was given by Birmingham City Council Planning Committee on 26 January 2012. At that time, however, it emerged that there was an outstanding Section 106 agreement for refurbishment. Quintain applied for permission to vary the Section 106 agreement, but later withdrew their application, claiming that since no building work had commenced they did not need to honour the Section 106 Agreement, which is only triggered when building work commenced.

The building was subsequently demolished in 2012.

References

External links 

 Birmingham Urban designer and Victorian Society Case Worker, Joe Holyoak on the campaign to save the building

Buildings and structures in Birmingham, West Midlands
Demolished buildings and structures in the West Midlands (county)
Buildings and structures demolished in 2012